The Kantakuzina Katarina Branković Serbian Orthodox Secondary School, abbreviated as SPOG, is a coeducational gymnasium (e.g. preparatory high school or grammar school) of the Metropolitanate of Zagreb and Ljubljana located in Zagreb, Croatia. It is the only non-seminary high school of the Serbian Orthodox Church in the former Yugoslavia.

The school was founded in 2005, continuing a 200-years old tradition of Orthodox minority education in the city. Classes are conducted in Serbian and Croatian language.

The four-year course of study includes Serbian, Croatian, English, German, Latin, Church Slavonic, history, geography, politics, economics, music, art history, the Orthodox religion, sociology, psychology, chemistry, physics, biology, mathematics, physical education, ecology, informatics and philosophy. All courses are required.

Education at SPOG is free; The Serbian Orthodox Church in Croatia covers costs for 
all admitted students (disputed). The student body hails from Croatia, Serbia, Bosnia and Herzegovina, Hungary and Moldova; the school is open to anyone who meets the enrollment criteria, regardless of background, religion or nationality. The school is accredited by the Croatian Ministry of Education, and is recognized by other countries in the region. SPOG graduates are studying in Croatia, Serbia, Bosnia, Hungary, Turkey and Russia. The first graduating class was commended at the monastery of the Parascheva of the Balkans in Zagreb on 24 June 2009.

Name
The school is named after Kantakuzina Katarina Branković, daughter of Serbian despot Đurađ Branković and his wife Irene Kantakouzene (from the Kantakouzenos family, a noble family in the Byzantine Empire). Kantakuzina Katarina Branković spent part of her life in Zagreb area, and contributed to the development of the regional Orthodox community.

History
Although the present school has a brief history, education organized by the Metropolitanate of Zagreb, Ljubljana and all Italy dates back to early 1814. Lessons were given at the Metropolitanate headquarters on Ilica Street.

Serbian Folk Grammar School
In 1888 the Metropolitan began to collect funds for a Serbian Folk Grammar School, established in 1891 on Mesnička Street. In 1893 the school moved to Margaretska Street, and the following year it was visited by Izidor Kršnjavi. At that time, the school had a garden and a library.

Serbian Autonomous Folk School
In 1897, the Serbian Folk Grammar School changed its name to the Serbian Autonomous Folk School. In 1899, the school commemorated the 50th anniversary of the career of Jovan Jovanović Zmaj. It moved in 1900 to Petar Preradović Square. The school's Teachers Council began in 1906. In 1909 it moved to a new building on Bogovićva Street, where SPOG would be established in 2005. In 1913, the school visited Zagreb mayor Janko Holjac. The school was discontinued during World War I, opening after the war as a girls' boarding school. It kept its name until 1922, when it became a public school: the State Primary School of King Peter I The Liberator.

Serbian Orthodox Secondary School
On 2 October 2003, a meeting was held at the Metropolitanate of Zagreb, Ljubljana and all Italy deciding to reopen the school under the patronage of the Metropolitanate. On 14 January 2004 Metropolitan Jovan sent a letter of intent to the Ministry of Education, and on 20 October a commission met to establish the school. On 21 February 2005, the high school was chartered. Stories about the school have appeared in Jutarnji list, Novosti, Politika, Večernji list, Novi list, on Radio Television of Serbia, Radio Televizija Republike Srpske, the website of the President of Croatia, Croatian Radiotelevision and Radio Television of Vojvodina.

New campus
For the 2011–12 academic year, the school moved into a 6,000-square-foot, €7,000,000 campus in northern Zagreb. It features a library, computer lab, a gym, a playground, student-counselling offices, a cafeteria, a music hall, laboratories, a chapel, a terrace, garden and a quadrangle. Construction began in May 2010. The cornerstone ceremony was attended by the bishop of the Metropolitanate of Dabar and Bosnia Nikolaj, Bishop of Srem Vasilije, Bishop of Eastern America Mitrophan, and hosted by Metropolitan Jovan.

Vice Prime Minister of Croatia Slobodan Uzelac expressed his hope that the school would offer university-level programs in the future. Zagreb mayor Milan Bandić said that the Serbian Orthodox community is integral to the Zagreb family and recalled early Serbian schools in Zagreb. The June 2012 opening ceremony was attended by Serbian Patriarch Irinej and a delegation from the Holy Synod; the patriarch also met with Ivo Josipović and Zoran Milanović. It was the first official visit of Patriarch of the Serbian Orthodox Church to Croatia since the breakup of Yugoslavia. The visit was reported by Al Jazeera Balkans, Croatian Radiotelevision, Nova TV, Večernji list, Novi list, 24sata, Slobodna Dalmacija, Radio Television of Serbia, B92, Večernje novosti, Press, Blic, Radio Free Europe, Radio and Television of Bosnia and Herzegovina, RTV BN, Kurir and Prva Srpska Televizija.

The opening ceremony was attended by several bishops and the patriarch of the Serbian Orthodox Church, Croatian government ministers Željko Jovanović and Predrag Matić, ambassadors from Serbia, US, Russia, Norway, France, Canada and Bosnia, delegations from Austria, Ukraine and the Vatican, Milorad Pupovac representing the Croatian Parliament, Croatian Academy of Sciences and Arts president Zvonko Kusić, mayor Milan Bandić, MPs and representatives of other religious communities. Croatian President Ivo Josipović appeared in a video made for the occasion directed by Dejan Aćimović.

Educational Program

Activities

Workshops with IRCT
Starting from May 2011, Serbian Orthodox Secondary School in collaboration with local office of International Rehabilitation Council for Torture Victims work on a series of workshops on psychological issues with first grade students. They cover topics such as identity, violence, family dynamics, self-perception and self-confidence. Specific aspects of school student body are addressed, namely identity formation of adolescents - members of ethnic minorities.

Meeting of Council of the Serbian language teachers
In December 2011, in collaboration with Council of the Serbian language teachers of Vukovar-Syrmia County, Osijek-Baranja County and Joint Council of Municipalities in school was organized conference for Serbian language teachers in primary and secondary schools in Croatia for 50 participants.

Professors
Professorial staff is composed mostly of young professionals, big part of them gained part of their education or career at the most prestigious universities in Russia, the United States, United Kingdom, Europe and region such as Bard College, Moscow State University, University of the Western Cape, University of Gothenburg, University of Tromsø, Ljubljana University, Belgrade University, Zagreb University, University Josip Juraj Strossmayer.

See also
 Gymnasium (school)
 Metropolitanate of Zagreb, Ljubljana and all Italy
 Italian Secondary School in Rijeka
 Secondary Education
 Serbian Orthodox Church
 Education in Croatia
 Order of Kantakuzina Katarina Branković

References

Sources

External links
 Official site
 Newspaper article in English
 Presentation of new campus
 Newspaper article
 Newspaper article
 Croatian president visits school-statement on the official site of his Office

Education in Zagreb
Serbian minority institutions and organizations in Croatia
Serbian Orthodox Church in Croatia
Secondary schools in Croatia
Eastern Orthodox schools
Educational institutions established in 2005
Christian schools in Croatia
Eastern Orthodox educational institutions
Selective schools
Private schools in Croatia
Bilingual schools
Serbian schools outside Serbia
Educational institutions of the Serbian Orthodox Church
2005 establishments in Croatia
Gymnasiums in Croatia
Metropolitanate of Zagreb and Ljubljana
Minority schools